Miguel Sotelo (22 June 1933 – 6 July 2007) was a Mexican professional baseball pitcher and manager who spent more than 25 years in professional baseball.

Career
Sotelo debuted in 1953 with the Águilas de Mexicali club of the Arizona–Texas League. The following year he was under the orders of George Genovese in a minor league team in Hutchinson, Kansas Pittsburgh Pirates lower division club. In 1955, he then was transferred to the Arizona–Mexico League where he excelled with the Cananea BBC pitching a no-hitter against the Phoenix Stars.

One year later he made his Mexican League debut with the Tigres del México. He also played for the Cañeros de Los Mochis and in his first year had a record of 18-6 with 13 consecutive wins.

In the 1962-1963 season, while playing for the Naranjeros de Hermosillo, he pitched a no hitter against the Navajo BBC. He retired in 1967 with a total of 133 win 115 losses in the Mexican League and with a record of 130-88 in the winter Mexican Pacific League.

Sotelo started his managerial career in 1968 with the Tecolotes de Nuevo Laredo, and later managed for the  Broncos de Reynosa (1969–1970), Alijadores de Tampico (1971), Pericos de Puebla (1972), Sultanes de Monterrey (1973–1976; 1986), Mineros de Coahuila (1977), Tecolotes de Nuevo Laredo (1978), Rojos del Águila de Veracruz (1979–1980), Olmecas de Tabasco (1987; 1990) and Acereros de Monclova (1988). In 1969 he guided Reynosa to win the league championship.

In 1985, Sotelo was enshrined in the Mexican Professional Baseball Hall of Fame.

Managerial achievements

References

Baseball Reference
Mexican Baseball League
Treto Cisneros, Pedro (2002). The Mexican League/La Liga Mexicana: Comprehensive Player Statistics, 1937-2001. McFarland & Company. 

1934 births
2007 deaths
Águilas de Mexicali players
Baseball players from Sinaloa
Broncos de Reynosa players
Hutchinson Elks players
Mexican Baseball Hall of Fame inductees
Mexican League baseball managers
Mexican League baseball pitchers
Mineros de Cananea players
Odessa Oilers players
Pericos de Puebla players
Rieleros de Aguascalientes players
Sportspeople from Los Mochis
Tecolotes de Nuevo Laredo players
Tigres del México players